Pont Cych is a single-arch, Grade II-listed bridge over Afon Cych at Cwmcych in the Cych Valley, bordering Carmarthenshire and Pembrokeshire, Wales.

History
The bridge was rebuilt in 1737 (indicating an earlier bridge existed) and probably rebuilt in the 19th century.

The CADW citation says: 

It was listed as the best example of the several bridges over Afon Cych. It carries a minor road that leads to the village of Llanfyrnach from the Cych valley.

The bridge, opposite the former Fox and Hounds inn, was a meeting place for the Tivyside Hounds for fox hunting in the late 19th century.

There is a recently-working hydro-power installation at the bridge, according to the British Hydropower Association's 2014 map of the UK. In 2017, it caused some concern from Natural Resources Wales in respect of its construction design.

References

Bridges in Wales
Grade II listed bridges in Wales
Grade II listed buildings in Pembrokeshire
Grade II listed buildings in Carmarthenshire